Iveta Benešová and Anabel Medina Garrigues were the defending champions, but decided not to participate.
Andrea Hlaváčková and Renata Voráčová won the title, defeating Nina Bratchikova and Sandra Klemenschits 6–3, 6–4 in the final.

Seeds

Draw

Draw

References
 Main Draw

Grand Prix SAR La Princesse Lalla Meryem - Doubles
Morocco Open
2011 in Moroccan tennis